The Institut d'Art et d'Archéologie is a building at 3 rue Michelet in Paris, built for the educational institution of the same name (French for "Institute of Art and Archaeology"). It was initially designed in 1920 in a unique eclectic style by architect Paul Bigot, and completed in 1932. It has been dubbed "the most curious building in Paris".

Overview

In 1908, designer Jacques Doucet initiated a pioneering library of art-related books complemented by research works he sponsored, and in late 1917 donated it to the University of Paris. In 1913, Paris University administrator  advocated the creation of a new art history institute and received a promise from Marchioness Marie-Louise Arconati-Visconti for a donation of two million francs, which she later increased to three million. Additional funds were contributed by the City of Paris and the French government. 

Paul Bigot won the two-round architectural competition in October 1920, with a design conceived as an alternative to the architectural rationalism that was ascendant in France at the time.

The building's structure is made of reinforced concrete, and its facades are clad with bright red brick manufactured at the Gournay brickworks on the current municipality of Vitry-sur-Seine. The unique design carries echoes of Tuscan Renaissance architecture and the Doge's Palace in Venice,, but Bigot's creative reinterpretation has also elicited comparisons with a synagogue, a hammam, a sub-Saharan African kasbah, the Alhambra in Granada, the Baths of Diocletian and church of Santa Maria in Ara Coeli in Rome, among others. Construction started in May 1924 and was substantially completed in 1928, but the decoration and interior fittings took four more years. It was formally inaugurated in 1931. The exterior frieze, first sketched by Bigot in 1922, was only completed in 1934, and the Doucet Library was eventually installed in 1935.

On the ground level runs a red terracotta frieze, mostly produced at the Manufacture nationale de Sèvres, that reproduces iconic sculptures whose study was part of the art history curriculum. Mirroring Bigot's eclectic mixing of distinct periods of art history on the brick facades, the main door combines motifs of ancient Roman lattice and medieval quatrefoil, and the side doors display a mix of Greek volutes and quatrefoil.

On the upper (fourth) floor, Bigot reserved a large space for a copy of his lifelong passion, a large plan-relief of ancient Rome in plaster (predating Italo Gismondi's more famous  at the Museum of Roman Civilization). The Institute's model, installed in September 1933, was destroyed by students during May 68, whereas the surviving  is now kept at the University of Caen Normandy.

In 1993, Doucet's library left the Institute to join the Bibliothèque nationale de France, and was transferred to the newly created Institut National d'Histoire de l'Art in 2003. In March 1997, a new library was established in the Institute in its place hosting less rare art-related books and other resources, known as the -.

It was comprehensively renovated in the 2000s.

Gallery

See also
 Colonial School, Paris, nearby on avenue de l'Observatoire
 Bibliothèque littéraire Jacques-Doucet

Notes

External links

Monuments historiques of Paris
Paris-Sorbonne University
Art history